The 1985 Southwest Conference men's basketball tournament was held March 9–10, 1985, at Reunion Arena in Dallas, Texas. 

Number 1 seed Texas Tech defeated 2 seed Arkansas 67-64 to win their 2nd championship and receive the conference's automatic bid to the 1985 NCAA tournament.

Format and seeding 
The tournament consisted of the top 8 teams playing in a single-elimination tournament.

Tournament

References 

1984–85 Southwest Conference men's basketball season
Basketball in the Dallas–Fort Worth metroplex
Southwest Conference men's basketball tournament